Traister is a surname. Notable people with the surname include:

 Leo Traister (1919–2020), American football coach 
 Rebecca Traister (born 1975), American author

Jewish surnames